P. porphyrae can refer to two different species.  The specific epithet  means 'purplish-red.'

 Polaribacter porphyrae, a bacterium in the genus Polaribacter
 Pythium porphyrae, an oomycete that causes red rot disease in many edible seaweeds